Chandrasekhar–Kendall functions are the eigenfunctions of the curl operator derived by Subrahmanyan Chandrasekhar and P. C. Kendall in 1957 while attempting to solve the force-free magnetic fields. The functions were independently derived by both, and the two decided to publish their findings in the same paper.

where  is a unit vector and the scalar function  satisfies the Helmholtz equation, i.e.,

The same equation also appears in Beltrami flows from fluid dynamics where, the vorticity vector is parallel to the velocity vector, i.e., .

Derivation

Taking curl of the equation  and using this same equation, we get

.

In the vector identity , we can set  since it is solenoidal, which leads to a vector Helmholtz equation,

.

Every solution of above equation is not the solution of original equation, but the converse is true.  If  is a scalar function which satisfies the equation 
, then the three linearly independent solutions of the vector Helmholtz equation are given by

where  is a fixed unit vector. Since , it can be found that .

Cylindrical polar coordinates

Since here , we can think of  direction to be toroidal and  direction to be poloidal, consistent with the convention.

See also

Poloidal–toroidal decomposition
Woltjer's theorem

References 

Astrophysics
Plasma physics